The Jasmine Throne is a fantasy novel by British author Tasha Suri, published by Orbit UK in 2021. An epic fantasy set in a world inspired by ancient India, it is the first volume in the Burning Kingdoms trilogy. It won the World Fantasy Award for Best Novel in 2022.

A review in Locus praised the book's morally grey characters and its "intense, vivid atmosphere". Describing the novel as "lush, evocative, richly characterised, emotionally dense", Tor.com said that its main theme was the nature of power and its cost. The relationship between its female protagonists Malini and Priya was praised by Library Journal, which added that fans on Twitter and BookTok dubbed it part of the "Sapphic Saffron Trifecta" along with The Unbroken by C.L. Clark and She Who Became the Sun by Shelley Parker-Chan.

References 

2021 British novels
2021 fantasy novels
2020s LGBT novels
British fantasy novels
British LGBT novels
LGBT speculative fiction novels
Orbit Books books
World Fantasy Award-winning works